Najjar Deh (also Romanized as Najjār Deh) is a village in Kheyrud Kenar Rural District, in the Central District of Nowshahr County, Mazandaran Province, Iran. At the 2006 census, its population was 659, in 170 families.

References 

Populated places in Nowshahr County